That Was the Year That Was (1965) is a live album recorded at the hungry i in San Francisco, containing performances by Tom Lehrer of satiric topical songs he originally wrote for the NBC television series That Was The Week That Was, known informally as TW3 (1964–65).  All of the songs related to items then in the news. The album peaked at #18 on [[Billboard 200|Billboard'''s Top 200 Albums]] on January 8, 1966 and was on the chart for 51weeks.

In 2020, Lehrer donated all of his lyrics and music written by him to the public domain. He followed this on November 1, 2022 with all recording and performing rights of any kind, making all of his music that he has originally composed or performed free for anyone to use.

Track listing
Side one:
 "National Brotherhood Week" – 2:35
 "MLF Lullaby" – 2:25
 "George Murphy" – 2:08
 "The Folk Song Army" – 2:12
 "Smut" – 3:15
 "Send the Marines" – 1:46
 "Pollution" – 2:17

Side two:
 "So Long, Mom (A Song for World War III)" – 2:23
 "Whatever Became of Hubert?" – 2:13
 "New Math" – 4:28
 "Alma" – 5:27
 "Who's Next?" – 2:00
 "Wernher von Braun" – 1:46
 "The Vatican Rag" – 2:14

 Topics of songs 
Side one
 "National Brotherhood Week" – race relations in the U.S.; specifically, a week-long program sponsored by the National Conference for Community and Justice (NCCJ) held generally during the third week of February from the 1940s through the 1980s. The song criticizes liberal hypocrisy. (Lehrer: "It's fun to eulogize the people you despise, as long as you don't let 'em in your school.")
 "MLF Lullaby" – Ribs an ultimately failed U.S. proposal for a multilateral nuclear force as part of NATO
 "George Murphy" – George Murphy, dancer, actor, U.S. Senator from California, and Robert F. Kennedy (D, NY), the putative third senator from Massachusetts. Democratic voters of the time questioned whether an actor with no political experience could function as a Senator. (Lehrer: "Oh, gee, it's great: at last we've got a Senator who can really sing and dance!") He also criticizes Murphy's comments about Mexicans working in the US. 
 "The Folk Song Army" – Topical songs as part of the folk revival of the 1960s; also alludes to songs of the Republican side in the Spanish Civil War, especially "Venga Jaleo" which it excerpts musically. They are mocked as ineffective and having claimed bravery in advocating popular causes. (Lehrer:  "Remember the war against Franco / That's the kind where each of us belongs / Though he may have won all the battles / We had all the good songs")
 "Smut" – Censorship of obscenity, and the 1957 U.S. Supreme Court case Roth v. United States, which coined the expression "redeeming social importance"  (Lehrer: "As the judge explained the day that he acquitted my aunt Hortense / To be smut it must be utterly without redeeming social importance.") The song refers to Fanny Hill, which at the time of the recording was engaged in an anti-obscenity case, Memoirs v Massachusetts, that would not be resolved until the following year. It also references Lady Chatterley's Lover, which had been subject to a similar case, R v Penguin Books Ltd, in Britain in 1960.
 "Send the Marines" – The history and habit of using the United States Marine Corps to intervene in other, usually weaker, countries, the latest example being the most recent U.S. intervention in the Dominican Republic in April 1965. (In 2003, former chief UN weapons inspector Hans Blix told a Swedish radio program that he did not think that the Invasion of Iraq, "in the way it was justified, was compatible with the UN Charter," and then had the station play this very song.)
 "Pollution" – Environmental pollution (Lehrer: "Turn on your tap / And get hot and cold running crud.")

Side two
 "So Long, Mom (A Song for World War III)" – Nuclear war, Mutually Assured Destruction, nostalgia over past wars, and television news coverage. (Lehrer: "I feel that, if there's going to be any songs coming out of World War III, we'd better start writing them NOW.")  In this, he references a 1904 George M. Cohan song and show, Little Johnny Jones. "Whatever Became of Hubert?" – Hubert Humphrey, then U.S. Vice President under Lyndon B. Johnson. The song underscores the idea that going from any office to that of Vice President was actually a step down, because of traditional restrictions imposed by the President. (Lehrer: "Second fiddle's a hard part, I know / When they don't even give you a bow.")
 "New Math" – New Math, a trend at the time in the teaching of mathematics, is ribbed for being overly complex and quite confusing.
 "Alma" – Alma Mahler, who had recently died. Composer and painter; wife, successively, of Gustav Mahler, Walter Gropius, and Franz Werfel. (Lehrer: "It's people like that who make you realize how little you've accomplished. It's a sobering thought, for example, that, when Mozart was my age, he had been dead for two years." Lehrer was 37 at the time of this recording; Mozart died at the age of 35.)
 "Who's Next?" – Nuclear proliferation. An example of one of Lehrer's favorite styles, the List Song, it rattles off numerous places that either had already achieved the capacity to deploy nuclear weapons or could potentially do so, including a U.S. state ("We'll try to stay serene and calm / When Alabama gets the bomb!")  In later years, Lehrer replaced "Alabama" with "Neiman-Marcus."
 "Wernher Von Braun" – Before heading up the U.S. rocket development program during the 1960s Space Race with the Soviet Union, German-American rocket scientist Wernher von Braun had helped develop the infamous V-2 rocket for Nazi Germany. Hence the verse: "Once the rockets are up / Who cares where they come down? / That's not my department / Says Wernher Von Braun". (Said Lehrer: "And what will make it possible to spend $20 billion of your money to put some clown on the moon?  Why, it's good ol' American know-how, that's what!  Led by good ol' Americans like Dr. [exaggerated accent] Wernher Von Braun.") Contrary to popular belief, von Braun did not sue Tom Lehrer for defamation, nor has Lehrer been forced to relinquish all of his royalty income to Von Braun. Lehrer firmly denied those claims in a 2003 interview.
 "The Vatican Rag" – The Second Vatican Council and the reform of Roman Catholic liturgy (Upon performing this song in the hungry i nightclub in San Francisco, Lehrer was harshly criticized by actor Ricardo Montalbán, who happened to be in the audience that night. Montalbán shouted "How dare you make fun of my religion! I love my religion! I will die'' for my religion!"  To which Lehrer responded "Hey, no problem, as long as you don't fight for your religion.")

References

External links
 Tom Lehrer Discography
 Tom Lehrer performing some of the songs on TV in the 1960s

Tom Lehrer albums
1965 live albums
Reprise Records live albums
Warner Records live albums
1960s comedy albums
Live comedy albums
Albums free for download by copyright owner